Ryan Michael Jeffers (born June 3, 1997) is an American professional baseball catcher for the Minnesota Twins of Major League Baseball (MLB).

Amateur career
Jeffers attended Sanderson High School in Raleigh, North Carolina. In 2016, his senior year, he hit .398 with two home runs. Undrafted in the 2016 Major League Baseball draft, he enrolled at the University of North Carolina at Wilmington where he walked-on their baseball team.

In 2017, Jeffers' freshman year at UNCW, he appeared in only 13 games, but hit .348 with one home run and five RBIs. That summer, he played in the Coastal Plain League for the Wilmington Sharks. As a sophomore in 2018, he started 52 of 53 games and batted .328 with ten home runs and 32 RBIs, earning First-Team All-CAA honors. After the season, he played for the Upper Valley Nighthawks of the New England Collegiate Baseball League where he earned All-Star honors. In 2018, Jeffers' junior season at UNCW, he slashed .315/.460/.635 with 16 home runs and 59 RBIs over 62 starts, earning a First-Team All-CAA selection for the second consecutive year.

Professional career
After his junior year, Jeffers was selected by the Minnesota Twins in the second round with the 59th overall selection of the 2018 Major League Baseball draft. He signed with the Twins and made his professional debut with the Elizabethton Twins before he was promoted to the Cedar Rapids Kernels in July. Over 64 games between the two clubs, he slashed .344/.444/.502 with seven home runs and 33 RBIs. In 2019, he began the year with the Fort Myers Miracle, with whom he was named a Florida State League All-Star, before being promoted to the Pensacola Blue Wahoos in July, with whom he finished the season. Playing in 103 total games with both teams, Jeffers batted .264/.341/.421 with 14 home runs and 49 RBIs.

On August 20, 2020, Jeffers’ contract was selected by the Twins to the active roster. He made his major league debut that same day against the Milwaukee Brewers, recording two hits including one RBI over three at-bats in a 7–1 win. He finished the season batting .273/.355/.436 with three home runs and seven RBIs over 26 games. In 2021 for the Twins, Jeffers slashed .199/.270/.401 with 14 home runs and 35 RBIs over 85 games.

Personal life
Jeffers and his wife, Lexi, married in 2019.

References

External links

1997 births
Living people
Baseball players from Raleigh, North Carolina
Major League Baseball catchers
Minnesota Twins players
UNC Wilmington Seahawks baseball players
Elizabethton Twins players
Cedar Rapids Kernels players
Fort Myers Miracle players
Pensacola Blue Wahoos players